Clint David Robinson, OAM (born 27 July 1972) is an Australian sprint kayaker and surf lifesaver who has won a complete set of medals at the Summer Olympics (gold: 1992 K-1 1000 m, silver: 2004: K-2 500 m, bronze: 1996 K-1 1000 m).

Career

Robinson was born in Brisbane and grew up in Nambour on the Sunshine Coast of Queensland. A junior surf lifesaving champion, he won the Cadet Malibu Board Race at the 1987 National Surf Lifesaving Championships and the following year he was invited to train with the Australian Olympic kayak squad. Robinson would go on to compete in five Summer Olympics.

Clint Robinson became Australia's first canoe / kayak gold medallist when he defeated the Norwegian World Champion Knut Holmann to win the K-1 1000 m final at Barcelona in 1992. Robinson paddled magnificently in his Barcelona final, holding off sustained challenges from Greg Barton (US) and Marin Popescu (Romania), then emptying every reserve of energy in a finish that edged out the favourite Holmann. Afterwards he was so dehydrated that he was unable to produce a urine sample for doping analysis for six hours. Four years later in Atlanta, he lined up against Holmann again in the K-1 1000 m and led early, but finished with the bronze. In Athens in 2004, Robinson teamed with Nathan Baggaley to win a silver medal in the K-2 500 m.

At the ICF Canoe Sprint World Championships, Robinson won four medals with a gold (K-1 1000 m: 1994), two silvers (K-1 1000 m: 1995, K-4 10000 m: 1991), and a bronze (K-2 500 m: 1994).

Robinson, awarded an OAM for the finest national championship record of any surf lifesaver (when his gold-medal tally reached 30), was also a promising young rugby league footballer, but from the time he was 12 his ambition in sport never deviated. In that year, 1984, he was watching the Los Angeles Games on television when his father asked him what he wanted to do with his life. Back came the answer: "I want to go to the Olympics and win a gold medal."

Robinson competed in the Uncle Toby's Super Series (Professional Iron Man circuit) from 1989 to 1995 and donated both the board and ski legs of the races. Due to his heavy training regime for kayaks, Clint had little time to train for swimming and running and his performances on the Iron Man circuit suffered due to this.

Robinson has continued to compete in surf lifesaving winning a place on the Australian teams of 1993, 1995 and 1999. In 1999, he surpassed Trevor Hendy's record of 23 national titles to become the most successful Australian surf lifesaver ever. By 2008 at the Beijing 2008 Summer Olympics, he had extended his tally to 36 titles. He was inducted into the Surf Lifesaving Hall of Fame in 2004.

Clint is regarded as the greatest surfcraft competitor in the history of Surf Lifesaving. He has won Australian titles in the ski and board races and also won the board rescue, board relay, double ski, ski relay and taplin relay. His 13 open age individual titles rank only second to Ky Hurst.

In 2001, he was inducted into the Australian Institute of Sport 'Best of the Best'.
Robinson is now head coach of Sunshine Beach Surf Life Saving Club.

Robinson is also an experienced media professional, having worked as a commentator and sports presenter.  In 1998, he joined WIN Television as a sports presenter on the Sunshine Coast edition of WIN News.  He had previously been a commentator on WIN Television's coverage of the "Maroochy Surf Classic".

References

External links
Australian Olympic Committee profile

Wallechinsky, David and Jaime Loucky (2008). "Canoeing: Men's Kayak Singles 1000 Meters". In The Complete Book of the Olympics: 2008 Edition. London: Aurum Press Limited. p. 473.

1972 births
Sportspeople from the Sunshine Coast
Australian Institute of Sport canoeists
Australian male canoeists
Australian surf lifesavers
Canoeists at the 1992 Summer Olympics
Canoeists at the 1996 Summer Olympics
Canoeists at the 2000 Summer Olympics
Canoeists at the 2004 Summer Olympics
Canoeists at the 2008 Summer Olympics
Living people
Olympic canoeists of Australia
Olympic gold medalists for Australia
Olympic silver medalists for Australia
Olympic bronze medalists for Australia
Sportspeople from Brisbane
Olympic medalists in canoeing
Recipients of the Medal of the Order of Australia
ICF Canoe Sprint World Championships medalists in kayak
Medalists at the 2004 Summer Olympics
Medalists at the 1996 Summer Olympics
Medalists at the 1992 Summer Olympics
Sport Australia Hall of Fame inductees